Lovrich is a surname. Notable people with the surname include:

Anthony Lovrich (born 1961), Australian rower
 Giovanni Lovrich ( 1756–1777), Croatian writer, ethnographer, and medical student
Pete Lovrich (1942–2018), American baseball pitcher

See also
Lovrić